Uladzimir Karyzna (born 25 May 1938) is a poet from Belarus. Karyzna co-wrote the lyrics of the current national anthem of Belarus, My Belarusy.

Biography
Karyzna was born on 25 May 1938 in Zakruzhka, Minsk District. He finished the Belarusian state university in the name of  Vladimir Lenin (1961), and worked as a teacher of the Belarusian and Russian languages and literature in a village school in Opsa, Braslaw District of the Vitsebsk Region. During this time, Karyzna headed literary association in the regional newspaper Braslaw star.

In 1967, he became an employee of Republican radio, where he worked for 13 years as an editor, senior editor, and in the head division of Belarusian music. He was an editor of the division of knowledge and arts in the magazine Polimya (1980–1981), senior editor, head of the editing of the edition Youth (1981–2001), and deputy of the main editor in the edition Well (2002).

Works and activity
Karyzna is the author of more than 200 songs, written in sponsorship with well-known Belarusian composers. He is the author of the hymn of Nesvizh and co-wrote the lyrics of the Belarusian national anthem. Karyzna is a member of the Union of Writers of Belarus, the commission of support to youth, the commission of state prizes, a judge of the competition energetica, a judge of the Republican Youth Singing competition, a representative of the commission for prizes for trade unions, and a delegate of the 3rd National Assembly of the Republic of Belarus.

Awards
Karyzna is a laureate of the state prize of the Republic of Belarus (1996), the prize of trade unions of the Belarusian SSR (1991). He was awarded with the Certificate of the Supreme Soviet of the BSSR, the Certificate of the Supreme Soviet of the Lithuanian SSR, and the Order of Francysk Skaryna.

External links
Interview 
Interview with Karyzna 
Info on Minsk region's government site 

1938 births
Living people
Belarusian writers
Belarusian composers
National anthem writers